Nisbet is an unincorporated community in Susquehanna Township, Lycoming County, Pennsylvania,  United States.

It was named for John Nisbet, an early settler of Williamsport, who applied for a tract of land in 1769.

Notes

Unincorporated communities in Lycoming County, Pennsylvania
Unincorporated communities in Pennsylvania